Khvanand (also Romanized as Khvānand; also known as Khanand, Khānind, Khūnand, and Khvānad) is a village in Qaleh Zari Rural District, Jolgeh-e Mazhan District, Khusf County, South Khorasan Province, Iran. At the 2006 census, its population was 14, in 7 families.

References 

Populated places in Khusf County